Ford Motor Company of Canada, Limited (French: Ford du Canada Limitée) was founded on August 17, 1904, for the purpose of manufacturing and selling Ford automobiles in Canada and the British Empire. It was originally known as the Walkerville Wagon Works and was located in Walkerville, Ontario (now part of Windsor, Ontario). The founder, Gordon Morton McGregor, convinced a group of investors to invest in Henry Ford's new automobile, which was being produced across the river in Detroit, Michigan.

The firm manufactures and sells automobiles in Canada, and also in the United States and other countries around the world.

History
The Ford Motor Company of Canada is a wholly owned subsidiary of Ford Motor Company, although it once had its own distinct group of shareholders. At its formation, Ford Motor Company was not a shareholder of Ford Canada, but its twelve founding shareholders directly held 51% of Ford Canada's shares, and Henry Ford himself owned 13% of the new company. The company had gained all Ford patent rights and selling privileges to all parts of the British Empire, except Great Britain and Ireland. It eventually established and managed the following subsidiaries:

 Ford Motor Company of Southern Africa
 Ford India Private Limited
 Ford Motor Company of Australia
 Ford Motor Company of New Zealand

The Model C, the first car to be produced in Canada, rolled out of the factory in late September 1904. The company could produce two cars at a time and in its first full year of production, the company was able to produce 117 automobiles. The company's first export sales were to Calcutta, India. Ford is still an important manufacturing enterprise in Windsor.

With the growth in car sales after World War II, together with the acquisition of majority control by Ford Motor Company, Ford of Canada decided to move its head office and build a new assembly plant in Oakville, Ontario. The new Oakville assembly plant was opened in 1953. In order to meet ever increasing demand, the Company opened another assembly plant in Talbotville, Ontario in 1967.

Historically Ford was one of the most powerful companies in Canada, and in the 1970s, Ford was the "largest" company in Canada.

By 1989, during a peak in the environmental movement, the Ford Motor Company of Canada (particularly its Oakville plant) was listed among the "dirty dozen" polluters in Ontario:

Ford of Canada celebrated its Centennial in 2004, shortly after the Parent Company Ford in the United States did in 2003. That year also saw the compulsory acquisition by Ford Motor Company of the last of the shares held by minority shareholders, which had been originally proposed in 1995. However, the last litigation in the matter, dealing with an oppression remedy claim by the Ontario Municipal Employees Retirement System with respect to its shareholdings, was only resolved by the Ontario Court of Appeal in January 2006.

In 2010, Ford was embroiled in a controversy surrounding a plan to construct a massive gas-fired power plant to be operated by TransCanada on a disused  portion of its Oakville assembly plant.  Local residents and politicians pleaded with Ford not to continue with the plan, as residents believed it would negatively impact their health and safety. The province cancelled the generating station in October 2010 and both Ford and TransCanada withdrew their planned appeals to the Ontario Municipal Board the following January. The plant was one of two involved in the Ontario power plant scandal, which contributed to the resignation of Premier Dalton McGuinty and Energy Minister Chris Bentley.

Key executives
In 2021, Bev Goodman became president/CEO of Ford Motor Company of Canada, replacing the legendary Dean Stoneley who has been appointed as general manager, North America truck, Ford Motor Company, a newly created position. Previous CEO's include Mark Buzzell who replaced Diane Craig effective January 1, 2017.

Before Craig, Mondragon had served as president and CEO since September 1, 2008, when he replaced Barry Engle who resigned to join New Holland America as its CEO. William H. Osborne had held the position since 2005 and was replaced by Engle in February 2008.

Facilities

Current

Former

Vehicles produced

The Ford Edge and Lincoln MKX are currently manufactured in Oakville.

Ford Canada has also produced the following models over the years:

References

Further reading

External links
 
 Lincoln Canada
 Technical Information Software and PDF Manuals from Ford

 

Canadian brands
Car manufacturers of Canada
Canadian subsidiaries of foreign companies
Companies based in Oakville, Ontario
Vehicle manufacturing companies established in 1904
Automotive industry in Canada
Canadian companies established in 1904